Tommaso Garzoni, (born Ottaviano, Bagnacavallo, 1549 – 1589), was an Italian Renaissance writer.

Life
Tommaso Garzoni was born in March 1549 in Bagnacavallo (a village in the Papal States near Ravenna) to a humble family, who however succeeded to pay for his education. He briefly studied law in Ferrara, then logic in Siena.
At the age of seventeen, on 18 October 1566, he entered in the Canons Regular of the Lateran, the religious order who held the Santa Maria in Porto Basilica in Ravenna. On that occasion he took the religious name of Tommaso (or Tomaso).

With a prodigious inventive faculty, in the last six years of his short existence he wrote all the works - bizarrely encyclopedic - that would make him famous.

Garzoni's eclectic work had a vast European success (numerous translations and reprints), to the point of consecrating him among the most popular Italian authors of the late sixteenth century. Today, after a long oblivion, Garzoni is again discovered and analyzed by critics.

He was also the first to write in Italian a complete biographical catalog of women in the Bible (Le vite delle donne illustri della Sacra Scrittura).

Returned to his birth town to preach on the Bible, he died on 8 June 1589, and he was buried in the local church of Saint Francesco.

Works 

In Italian
 Il Theatro de' vari, e diversi cervelli mondani, Venezia, 1583
 La piazza universale di tutte le professioni del mondo, Venezia, 1585
 L'hospidale de pazzi incurabili, Venezia, 1586
 Le vite delle donne illustri della Scrittura sacra, Venezia, 1586
 La sinagoga de gl'ignoranti, Venezia, 1589
 Il mirabile cornucopia consolatorio, Bologna, 1601 (posthumous)
 L'huomo astratto, Venezia, 1604 (posthumous)
 Il serraglio de gli stupori del mondo, Venezia, 1613 (posthumous)

Translations in French
 Le Théâtre des divers cerveaux du monde, translated by Gabriel Chappuys, Paris, J. Houzé, 1586
 L'Hospital des fols incurables, où sont déduites de poinct en poinct toutes les folies et les maladies d'esprit, tant des hommes que des femmes, translated by François de Clarier, sieur de Longval, Paris, F. Julliot, L. Sevestre, 1620
 L'hospidale de’ pazzi incurabili, 2001

Translations in English
 The Hospital of Incurable Madness. L'Hospedale de' Pazzi Incurabili (1586), by Tomas Garzoni, 2009

Translations in German
 Spital unheylsamer Narren und Närrinnen Herrn Thomasi Garzoni, auss der italiänischen Sprach teutsch gemacht durch Georgium Fridericum Messerschmid, Strassburg, J. Carolo, 1618
 Piazza universale, das ist allgemeiner Schawplatz, Marckt und Zusammenkunfft aller Professionen, Künsten, Geschäfften, Händeln und Handtwerken... erstmaln durch Thomam Garzonum italianisch zusammengetragen, anjetzo [...] verdeutscht Frankfurt am Mayn, W. Hoffmanns Buchdruckerei, 1641

Translations in Latin
 Emporium universale, translated by Nic. Belli, Francfort, 1614

Translations in Spanish
 Plaza universal de todas sciencias y artes, parte traduzida de toscano [de Thomaso Garzoni] y parte compuesta por el doctor Christóval Suárez de Figueroa, Perpiñan, 1630

Notes

References

1549 births
1589 deaths
Italian Renaissance writers
Italian Renaissance humanists
16th-century Italian writers
16th-century male writers
People from the Province of Ravenna